Eugene Maximillian, 1st Prince of Hornes (October 1, 1631 – March 10, 1709) was the son of Ambroise de Hornes, 2nd Count of Bassignies and Marie Marguerite de Bailleul de Lesdaing. He was a great-grandson of Philip de Lalaing, 3rd Count of Lalaing

He was made a Prince of the Empire on October 19, 1677, and his domain elevated to the Principality of Hornes. It was an enclave of Liege. He was married to Princess Anne Marie Jeanne of Croÿ and had one son, Philippe Emanuel, Prince of Hornes. He died 14 October 1718.

Bibliography
Gilliat-Smith, Ernest (1901). The History of Bruges. London: J. M. Dent.

Princes of Hornes
1631 births
1709 deaths